Caveman is a 1981 slapstick comedy film written and directed by Carl Gottlieb and starring Ringo Starr, Dennis Quaid, Shelley Long and Barbara Bach.

Plot
Atouk (Ringo Starr) is a bullied and scrawny caveman living in "One Zillion BC – October 9th". He lusts after the beautiful but shallow Lana (Barbara Bach), who is the mate of Tonda (John Matuszak), their tribe's physically imposing bullying leader and brutish instigator. After being banished along with his friend Lar (Dennis Quaid), Atouk falls in with a band of assorted misfits, among them the comely Tala (Shelley Long) and the elderly blind man Gog (Jack Gilford). The group has ongoing encounters with hungry dinosaurs, and rescues Lar from a "nearby ice age", where they encounter an abominable snowman. In the course of these adventures they discover sedative drugs and fire, invent cooking, music, and weapons, and learn how to walk fully upright. Atouk uses these advances to lead an attack on Tonda, overthrowing him and becoming the tribe's new leader. He rejects Lana and takes Tala as his mate, and they live happily ever after.

Cast
 Ringo Starr as Atouk
 Barbara Bach as Lana
 Dennis Quaid as Lar
 Shelley Long as Tala
 Jack Gilford as Gog
 Cork Hubbert as Ta
 Mark King as Ruck
 Paco Morayta as Flok
 Evan C. Kim as Nook
 Ed Greenberg as Kalta
 Carl Lumbly as Bork
 Jack Scalici as Folg
 Erika Carlsson as Folg's Mate
 Gigi Vorgan as Folg's Daughter
 Sara López Sierra as Folg's Younger Daughter
 Esteban Valdez as Folg's Son
 Juan Ancona Figueroa as Folg's Younger Son
 Juan Omar Ortiz as Folg's Youngest Son
 Anaís de Melo as Meeka
 John Matuszak as Tonda
 Avery Schreiber as Ock
 Tere Álvarez as Ock's Mate
 Miguel Ángel Fuentes as Grot
 Ana De Sade as Grot's Mate
 Gerardo Zepeda as Boola
 Hector Moreno	as Noota
 Pamela Gual as Noota's Mate
 Richard Moll as Abominable Snowman

Production
An international co-production between The United States and Mexico. Filming was mostly done in the Sierra de Órganos National Park in the town of Sombrerete in the state of Zacatecas, Mexico. The river and fishing lake scene was shot in the Mexican state of Durango, and some scenes were filmed at the Churubusco Studios in Mexico City. The film features stop motion animated dinosaurs constructed by Jim Danforth, including a Tyrannosaurus Rex which in one scene becomes intoxicated by a cannabis-type drug, animated by Randall W. Cook. Danforth was a major participant in the special effects sequences, but left the film "about two-thirds of the way" (his words) through the work because the Directors Guild of America prohibited his contracted on-screen credit, co-direction with Carl Gottlieb. Consequently, Danforth's name does not appear on the film.

The film's dialog is almost entirely in "caveman" language, such as:
 "aiyee" – help
 "alunda" – love
 "bobo" – friend
 "caca" – shit
 "gluglug" – drowned
 "guwi" – out to get
 "haraka" – fire
 "kuda" – come
 "macha" – monster
 "nya" – no/not
 "ool" – food
 "pooka" – broken/pain
 "ugh" – like
 "ya" – yes
 "zug zug" – sex/mate

At some showings audiences were issued a translation pamphlet for 30 "caveman words." The only English dialog present is used for comedic effect, when it is spoken by a caveman played by Evan Kim who speaks modern English but is understood by none of the other characters. Being a Korean caveman, by speaking English, he appears to be more advanced than the rest. At her audition, Long said she did not speak any English, but responded to everything with grunts.

Barbara Bach and Ringo Starr first met on the set of Caveman, and they married just over a year later.

Home media
The film was released on Region 1 DVD by MGM Home Entertainment on June 4, 2002. It was then released on February 17, 2015 on Blu-ray Disc by Olive Films.

Reception

On Rotten Tomatoes the film has an approval rating of 35% based on reviews from 20 critics, with an average rating of 4.7/10. On Metacritic the film has a score of 55% based on reviews from 7 critics, indicating "mixed or average reviews".

Roger Ebert gave the film 1.5 stars out of a possible 4. The cast was "interesting", he wrote, but the main failing of Caveman was it being a spoof with "no popular original material for it to satirize. There has never been a really successful movie set in prehistoric times." Ebert and Gene Siskel both gave the film a negative "don't see it" review on their TV show but softened their criticism somewhat by noting that its dinosaur-related sequences were amusing.

Janet Maslin of The New York Times wrote that the film was "dopey, but it's also lots of fun", and that the real star was the special-effects dinosaur. Pauline Kael of The New Yorker gave it a positive review, calling it "a funky, buoyant farce."<ref> Taking It All In (1984) </ref>

Gary Arnold of The Washington Post gave it a mixed review. He was critical with the lack of originality but suggests younger audiences who have not seen it before may enjoy it. Arnold compares the film unfavorably to The Three Ages, where Buster Keaton was able to bring his genius, Caveman'' struggles to overcome Starr's limits and director Gottlieb fails to make use of other talented actors such as Quaid, Schreiber, or Gilford.

References

External links

 
 
 
 Cavespeak: A Dictionary Of Cavese

1981 animated films
1981 films
1980s fantasy comedy films
American slapstick comedy films
Mexican comedy films
Films about dinosaurs
1980s English-language films
Fictional-language films
Films using stop-motion animation
Estudios Churubusco films
United Artists films
Films with screenplays by Carl Gottlieb
Films directed by Carl Gottlieb
Films scored by Lalo Schifrin
1981 comedy films
Films about Yeti
Films about cavemen
Films set in prehistory
Films with screenplays by Rudy De Luca
1980s American films
1980s Mexican films